Taxes in California are among the highest in the United States and are imposed by the state and by local governments.

From a tax terminology perspective, sales taxes are a proportional tax; though because lower income earners may pay a greater percentage of their earnings to sales taxes than higher income earners, a sales tax is also described as a regressive tax.

The sales tax is imposed on retailers (not consumers) for the privilege of selling tangible personal property at retail.  However, retailers are allowed (but not obligated) to obtain reimbursement for their tax liability from the consumer at the time of sale.  Whether a sales tax reimbursement amount is actually added is a matter of contract between the retailer and the consumer.

The use tax is imposed on the storage, use, or other consumption in California of tangible personal property purchased from a retailer.  Any person storing, using, or otherwise consuming in California tangible personal property purchased from a retailer is generally liable for the use tax.  While the sales tax is imposed on retailers, the use tax is imposed on purchasers.  A retailer engaged in business in California (which includes many businesses located outside of California engaging in E-commerce) is generally required to collect the use tax from the purchaser at the time of sale and provide the purchaser a receipt.

Sales tax 

At 7.25%, California has the highest minimum statewide sales tax rate in the United States, which can total up to 10.75% with local sales taxes included.

Sales and use taxes in California (state and local) are collected by the California Department of Tax and Fee Administration, whereas income and franchise taxes are collected by the Franchise Tax Board.

The statewide base sales tax rate of 7.25% is allocated as follows:
 7.25% – State + Local
 6.00% – State
 3.9375% – State – General Fund
 0.50% – State – Local Public Safety Fund
 0.50% – State – Local Revenue Fund for local health and social services
 1.0625% – State – Local Revenue Fund (2011)
 1.25% – Uniform Local Tax
 0.25% – Local County – Transportation funds
 1.00% – Local City/County – Operational funds

The statewide sales tax in California was first imposed on August 1, 1933, at the rate of 2.50% under the "Retail Sales Act of 1933."  No local sales taxes were levied at that time. In an editorial dated September 5, 1933, the Los Angeles Times criticized the 2.50% sales tax rate in stating that the "sales-tax rate should not have exceeded 1 per cent" and that the tax rate was "so high as to discourage business, which will make the tax less productive."

Supplementary local sales taxes 

Supplementary local sales taxes may be added by cities, counties, service authorities, and various special districts.  Local county sales taxes for transportation purposes are especially popular in California.  Additional local sales taxes levied by counties and municipalities are formally called "District Taxes."

The effect from local sales taxes is that sales tax rates vary in California from 7.25% (in areas where no additional local sales taxes are levied) to 10.75% (six cities located in Alameda County). For example, the city of Sacramento, the state capital, has a combined 8.75% sales tax rate, and Los Angeles, the largest city in California, has a combined 9.50% sales tax rate.

As of July 1, 2022, 62 local jurisdictions levy no additional local sales tax, while 6 cities (all located in Alameda County) have the highest combined sales tax rate in California at 10.75%.

Local sales tax rate cap 

The combined tax rate of all local sales taxes in any county is generally not allowed to exceed 2.00 percent.  However, this is a statutory restriction and the California Legislature routinely allows some local governments, through the adoption of separate legislation, to exceed the 2.00 percent local tax rate cap.  The 2.00 percent local tax rate cap is exceeded in any city with a combined sales tax rate in excess of 9.25% (7.25% statewide tax rate plus the 2.00% tax rate cap).

As of July 1, 2022, 140 California local jurisdictions have a combined sales tax rate in excess of the 2.00 percent local tax rate cap:

SB 566 (2003) and the rise in local sales tax increases 

The number of local sales taxes greatly increased following the passage of SB 566 in 2003.  SB 566 legally authorized all California cities to levy additional local sales taxes.  SB 566 also increased the maximum combined local sales tax rate (local sales tax rate cap) that can be levied by local governments from 1.50% to the current 2.00%.

As of April 1, 2017, 176 cities and 32 counties have approved local sales tax increases.  Not only has the number of local city sales taxes greatly increased since the passage of SB 566, but the magnitude of the sales tax increases (as measured by the sales tax rate increase) has also significantly increased as more cities are seeking larger sales tax rate increases.

Local sales taxes subject to voter approval under Proposition 218 

All local sales taxes are subject to voter approval under Proposition 218 ("Right to Vote on Taxes Act") which California voters approved in November 1996.  Whether simple majority voter approval or two-thirds voter approval is required depends upon the type of sales tax levied and the type of local government imposing the sales tax.

Unrestricted general sales taxes are subject to majority vote approval by local voters.  General sales taxes can be spent by local politicians for any general governmental purpose, including public employee salaries and benefits.  General sales tax spending decisions are made after the tax election by local politicians as part of the regular annual local government budget process.  Some local governments may engage in general sales tax abuses in an effort to evade the two-thirds vote requirement applicable to special sales taxes.

Special sales taxes dedicated for one or more specific purposes are subject to two-thirds voter approval by local voters.  Any sales tax imposed by a local government other than a city or a county (e.g., a special district such as a local transportation agency) must be a special tax subject to two-thirds voter approval by local voters.

Proposition 218 does not legally authorize any local government to levy a sales tax.  The legal authority to levy a local sales tax must come from a state statute.  A two-thirds vote of all members of the legislative body of the local government is usually required before a local sales tax measure may be presented to voters at an election.

Relationship between sales tax increases and public employee costs 

The driving force behind many local sales tax increases is skyrocketing public pension costs and public employee retiree healthcare.  Research has shown that local sales tax increases are concentrated in California localities that have the largest pension problems.

County transportation sales taxes 

Countywide sales taxes for transportation purposes are very popular in California.  However, transportation sales taxes are regressive and also shift the financial base of transportation systems from user fees to taxes paid by all taxpayers without regard to direct reliance on those transportation systems.  Some counties have passed multiple transportation sales taxes increases such as Los Angeles County that has passed four transportation sales tax increases for a combined rate of 2.00%.  County transportation sales taxes generally do not include traffic performance standards that actually require improved traffic conditions.

Sales tax taxpayer tool 

As part of its Taxpayer Tools publication series, the Howard Jarvis Taxpayers Association has released a publication to assist voters and taxpayers regarding local sales tax measures placed on the ballot by a local government in California.

Local government data in sales tax elections 

It is generally helpful for voters to have financial data about a local government proposing a sales tax so that voters can make more informed voting decisions regarding the merits and need for the sales tax.  Much of the financial data about a local government can be obtained directly from the local government itself.  Additional information that can be of value to voters includes public employee salary and benefits data (especially pension data), and annual budgetary and financial reports.  Local government budgetary spending priorities, as reflected by recent budgetary data, can also be helpful in general sales tax elections where local politicians decide how to spend the sales tax proceeds.

Extensive public data sources outside of a local government are also available to voters in connection with local sales tax elections.

Important issues related to local sales tax elections 

Local government issues related to sales tax elections (e.g., local government "informational" campaigns and impartial ballot questions) can impact the integrity and fairness of the election process. Voter/taxpayer issues related to local sales tax elections (e.g., cumulative tax burden and precedent) can impact the individual voter decision-making process as well as election outcomes. Support and opposition campaigns in local sales tax elections can also impact election outcomes.

Local sales tax reduction or repeal using Proposition 218 

Proposition 218 ("Right to Vote on Taxes Act") was a 1996 initiative constitutional amendment approved by California voters. Proposition 218 includes a provision constitutionally reserving to local voters the right to use the initiative power to reduce or repeal any local tax, assessment, fee or charge, including provision for a significantly reduced petition signature requirement to qualify a measure on the ballot.  A local sales tax, including a sales tax previously approved by local voters, is generally subject to reduction or repeal using the local initiative power under Proposition 218.

Examples where the reduction or repeal of a local sales tax may be appropriate include where there has been significant waste or mismanagement of sales tax proceeds by a local government, when there has been controversial or questionable spending of sales tax proceeds by a local government (particularly where sales tax proceeds are used to pay for excessive public employee salaries and/or benefits such as pensions), when the quality of the programs and services being financed from sales tax proceeds is not at a high level expected by voters, when the local sales tax rate is excessive or unreasonably high (particularly in situations where a significant local sales tax increase was narrowly approved by the voters), or when promises previously made by local politicians about the spending of local sales tax proceeds are broken after voter approval of the sales tax (particularly in situations where local politicians made legally nonbinding promises concerning the spending of general sales tax proceeds that are not legally restricted for specific purposes).

A local sales tax used to repay bonds is a legally more complex situation because federal contract impairment issues may preclude the exercise of the local initiative power under Proposition 218.  Local voter-approved transportation sales taxes often include at least a portion of the tax proceeds to repay bonds.  Advice from legal counsel is generally needed in situations where bonds have been issued and sales tax revenues have been pledged to repay the bonds.  A local compensatory initiative under Proposition 218 is an alternative option when contract impairment problems are present.

Recent statewide sales tax increases 

Recent temporary statewide sales tax increases include:

 From April 1, 2009 until June 30, 2011, the state sales and use tax increased by 1% from 7.25% to 8.25% as a result of the 2008-2009 California budget crisis.
 Effective January 1, 2013, the state sales and use tax increased by 0.25% from 7.25% to 7.50% as a result of Proposition 30 passed by California voters in the November 6, 2012 election. The change was a four-year temporary tax increase that expired on December 31, 2016.

Taxation of online sales 

As of July 1, 2011, California applies sales tax to online retailer purchases.  It is the retailer's responsibility to collect the state sales tax on all purchases made within (or shipped to) California regardless where the retailer/supplier is located. Businesses with multiple locations in the state may attribute all online sales taxes to a single jurisdiction, which had led to district-shopping for revenue-sharing deals with cities that return a portion of the collected sales tax to the business. In 2019, SB 531 was approved by the legislature to close this loophole, but was vetoed by Governor Gavin Newsom.

Exemptions 

In general, sales tax is required on all purchases of tangible personal property to its ultimate consumer. Services are not subject to sales tax (but may be subject to other taxes), although some politicians want to extend the sales tax to services.  Liability for sales tax attaches to the seller, not the buyer; but the seller is allowed by law to collect the tax from the buyer (and if the seller does so, the buyer is obligated to pay it).

Vehicle purchases are taxed based on the city and county in which the purchaser registers the vehicle, and not on the county in which the vehicle is purchased. There is therefore no advantage in purchasing a car in a county with a lower sales tax rate to save on sales tax (a one-percent difference in sales tax rate would otherwise result in an additional $300 loss on a $30,000 car).

In grocery stores, unprepared food items are not taxed but vitamins and all other items are. Ready-to-eat hot foods, whether sold by supermarkets or other vendors, are taxed. Restaurant bills are taxed. As an exception, hot beverages and bakery items are tax-exempt if and only if they are for take-out and are not sold with any other hot food.  If consumed on the seller's premises, such items are taxed like restaurant meals. All other food is exempt from sales tax.

Also excluded are food animals (livestock), food plants and seeds, fertilizer used to grow food, prescription drugs and certain medical supplies, energy utilities, certain alternative energy devices and supplies, art for display by public agencies, and veterans' pins.  There are many specific exemptions for various veterans', non-profit, educational, religious, and youth organizations.  Sale of items to certain out-of-state or national entities (mostly transportation companies) is exempt, as are some goods sold while in transit through California to a foreign destination.

Occasional or one-time sales not part of a regular business are exempt, except that sales of three or more non-food animals (puppies, kittens, etc.) per year are taxed.

There are also exemptions for numerous specific products, from telephone lines and poles, to liquid petroleum gas for farm machinery, to coins, to public transit vehicles.  There are partial exemptions for such varied items as racehorse breeding stock, teleproduction service equipment, farm machinery, and timber-harvesting equipment. For an organized list of exemptions, with estimates for how much revenue the state loses and the people saves for each, see Publication 61 of the Board of Equalization.

Sales tax is charged on gasoline. The tax is levied on both the gasoline and on the federal and state excise taxes, resulting in a form of "double taxation".  The sales tax is included in the metered price at the pump.  The California excise tax on gasoline as of mid-2011 is 35.7 cents per gallon for motor fuel plus a 2.25% sales and use tax, 13 cents per gallon for diesel plus a 9.12% sales and use tax.

The California Department of Tax and Fee Administration provides an online list of sales taxes in the local communities of the state.

Software electronically transmitted to customers 

According to Regulation 1502, the sale of noncustom (canned) software to customers who download the software from a server is generally not subject to sales tax because the transaction does not involve tangible personal property.  However, if the customer is provided a copy of the software on a physical storage medium such as a CD-ROM or a DVD, the entire transaction is generally subject to sales tax.  Thus, a customer can generally avoid sales tax liability by purchasing a downloadable version of software instead of a physical version.

Debate 

Critics of the current California sales tax system contend that it gives local governments an incentive to promote commercial development (through zoning and other regulations – otherwise known as fiscalization of land use) over residential development, including the use of eminent domain condemnation proceedings to transfer real estate to higher sales tax generating businesses. Some claim that low-income families pay almost eight times more of their incomes in sales taxes than high-income families, making sales tax a regressive tax.  Low-income families pay relatively little in income tax, leaving most of their income available to spend thus subject to sales taxes.  It is also because people with higher incomes are able to save a larger portion of their income.  However, since lower income families spend a higher portion of their income on groceries, states like California that exempt groceries from sales tax are not as regressive in the implementation of sales taxes.

Payroll tax 

As of 2020, California charges between 3.4 (new employers) and 6.2 percent (maximum) in Unemployment Insurance (UI) Tax on the first 7000 dollars of wages in a year, paid by the employer. Employment Training Tax (ETT) is 0.1 percent, paid by some employers, on the first 7000 dollars of wages. State Disability Insurance (SDI) Tax is 1.20 percent of the first $128,298 in wages, paid by the employee.

Income tax 

As of 2019, income tax for singles is 1% to $8,809, 2% to $20,883, 4% to $32,960, 6% to $45,753, 8% to $57,824, 9.3% to $295,373, 10.3% to $354,445, 11.3% to $590,742, and 12.30% thereafter. There is an additional 1% tax (the California Mental Health Services Act tax) if your taxable income is more than $1,000,000, which results in a top income tax rate of 13.3% in California. The standard deduction is $4,601 for 2020.

See also 

California Proposition 218
California Proposition 218 Local Initiative Power

References